The 1991–92 season was Burnley's 104th season of League football and their seventh consecutive campaign in the fourth tier of English football. Frank Casper started the season as manager, having been appointed to the post two years previously, before he was replaced by Jimmy Mullen in October 1991.

Background and pre-season
Frank Casper started the season as manager of Burnley, having originally held the post in a caretaker capacity during the 1982–83 campaign and then returning as the permanent appointment in January 1989. The chairman of the club was Frank Teasdale, who had taken control of Burnley in May 1985. The team had steadily improved since their narrow avoidance of relegation on the last day of the 1986–87 season, and having reached the play-offs at the end of the previous campaign, the Burnley side was confident of achieving promotion back to the Football League Third Division for the first time in seven years.

Burnley began their pre-season with a short tour of Russia in July 1991. A Mike Conroy goal helped the team to a 1–1 draw with FC Dynamo Stavropol in the first game of the tour, followed by a match at Asmaral which ended in the same scoreline four days later. Upon their return to England, Burnley competed in the Lancashire Manx Cup but were knocked out in the group stage following defeats to Bury and Preston North End and a draw with rivals Blackburn Rovers. On 8 August, Burnley played a testimonial match against Oldham Athletic at Turf Moor in honour of former physiotherapist Jimmy Holland, who had assisted the club between 1965 and 1991.

Transfers
The majority of the team from the previous campaign remained at Burnley, with only three new players signing permanent contracts during the close season. Mark Yates was signed from Birmingham City on a free transfer, while fellow midfielder Steve Harper joined from Lancashire rivals Preston North End. Fees were paid for two players; striker Mike Conroy arrived from Reading for a transfer fee of £35,000, and central defender Steve Davis, who had spent a spell on loan at Burnley in the 1989–90 campaign, was bought for £60,000 from Southampton. Goalkeeper Andy Marriott also joined the club on loan from Nottingham Forest in August 1991. Several players also departed Burnley during the summer of 1991. Neil Grewcock and Ray Deakin, the last two to remain from the side that achieved a 2–1 win against Orient in May 1987 to avoid relegation to the Football Conference, both left the club; Deakin retired from football at the age of 32, while Grewcock moved into the amateur game with local club Burnley Bank Hall. The contract of Ron Futcher, Burnley's top scorer in the previous season with 19 goals, was terminated by mutual consent and he subsequently joined Crewe Alexandra.

Following the appointment of Jimmy Mullen as manager in October 1991, Burnley resumed their activity in the transfer market. Two more goalkeepers, Mark Kendall and Nicky Walker, were brought in on loan. Adrian Randall arrived from Aldershot in December 1991, while Paul McKenzie joined from Scottish side Peterhead a month later. Burnley's last signing of the season was midfielder Robbie Painter, who was bought for £25,000 from fellow Fourth Division club Maidstone United on transfer deadline day in March 1992. In April 1992, Ian Bray was forced to retire from professional football due to an injury, and Jason Hardy departed for Halifax Town the same month.

Appearances and goals

|}

Matches

Football League Division Four
Key

In Result column, Burnley's score shown first
H = Home match
A = Away match

pen. = Penalty kick
o.g. = Own goal

Results

Expunged fixtures
Burnley played two matches against Aldershot during the 1991–92 campaign, winning both games. However, these results were expunged from official records after Aldershot resigned from the Football League mid-season.

Final league position

FA Cup

League Cup

Football League Trophy

References
General

Specific

Burnley F.C. seasons
Burnley